Gospel Hill Historic District is a national historic district located at Staunton, Virginia. The district encompasses 180 contributing buildings in a primarily residential section of Staunton.  The district is characterized by an abundance of fine homes, ranging in size from cottages to mansions and dating from 1840 to 1930.  The buildings include distinguished examples of a century of architectural styles from Greek Revival to Bungalow.   Notable buildings include "Kalorama" (c. 1800), "Capote" (1905), Effinger House (c. 1898), and Temple House of Israel (1925).  Located in the district are the separately listed Woodrow Wilson Birthplace, Catlett House, Arista Hoge House, J. C. M. Merrillat House, Thomas J. Michie House, Oakdene, and The Oaks.

It was added to the National Register of Historic Places in 1985.

References

Historic districts on the National Register of Historic Places in Virginia
Greek Revival architecture in Virginia
Buildings and structures in Staunton, Virginia
National Register of Historic Places in Staunton, Virginia